Gao Wei Guang (born 16 January 1983) is a Chinese actor and supermodel. He is known for his lead roles in hit dramas Candle In The Tomb: The Wrath Of Time, Eternal Love Of Dream, etc.

Career

2006–2013: Modeling career 
Gao debuted as a model after winning 2nd place in New Silk Road Model Look competition in 2006. He continued his career as a successful international supermodel till 2013.

2014–2016: Acting debut 
Gao joined Jay Walk Studio and made his acting debut as the male lead in 2014 web series, V Love. The same year, he starred in the fantasy drama, Swords of Legends. From 2015 to 2016, Gao gained increased recognition from playing supporting roles in military drama Destined to Love You, Legend of Ban Shu, The Ladder of Love, etc. He played second male lead in 2016 workplace series The Interpreter. In the same year, he starred in suspense crime action film Heartfall Arises.

2017–2018: Rising Popularity
In 2017, Gao starred in fantasy romance drama Eternal Love, gaining popularity for his role as "Dong Hua". He won Media Recommended Actor of the Year award in China TV Drama Awards for his performance. He also starred in Xuan-Yuan Sword: Han Cloud, a fantasy action drama. In the same year he had his first big screen leading role in romantic comedy film Mr. Pride vs Miss Prejudice. 

In 2018 Vengo starred in popular fantasy drama Legend of Fuyao.

2019-Present:Breakthrough
In 2019, Gao starred in the third installment of Candle in the Tomb series, The Wrath of Time as one of the three main leads. He received the Best Actor (Period Drama) Award at the 26th Huading Awards for his performance.

In 2020, Gao starred as the male lead in fantasy romance drama Eternal Love of Dream, reprising his role as" Dong Hua" from Eternal Love. This role caused further increase in his popularity. He received the Best Actor (Period Drama) Award and Top Ten Most Popular Actor Award at 29th Huading Awards for his performance. He also starred in the fourth installment of Candle in the Tomb series, The Lost Caverns, reprising his popular role as "Partridge Whistle" or "Zhe Gu Shao". In the same year he starred as the main lead in popular dramas Miss S and Living Toward The Sun.

In 2021 and  2022 Vengo starred in popular dramas "Dreams and Glory", "Sword Snow Stride"and military-action drama "Operation Special Warfare".

Filmography

Film

Television series

Modeling Career Achievements
Gao Weiguang was one of the top ten male models in China from 2009 to 2012.<

Awards and nominations

References

External links 
 
 
 Vengo Gao Fanclub
 Vengo Gao International Fan Group

1983 births
Living people
21st-century Chinese male actors
Chinese male film actors
Chinese male television actors
Jay Walk Studio
People from Jixi
Male actors from Heilongjiang
Central Academy of Drama alumni